Volga (Privolzhsky) Federal District (Privolzhsky federalny okrug) is one of the eight federal districts of Russia. It forms the southeastern part of European Russia. It is the second most populated federal district (after Central). Igor Komarov was appointed the federal district's Presidential Envoy on 18 September 2018.

Demographics

Federal subjects
The district comprises the Volga (part), Volga-Vyatka and Urals (part) economic regions and fourteen federal subjects:

Ethnic composition, according to the 2010 census: Total - 29,899,699 people.

Russians - 19,811,351 (66.26%)

Tatars - 3,999,568 (13.38%)

Bashkirs - 1,282,794 (4.29%)

Chuvash - 1,272,790 (4.26%)

Mordva - 617,050 (2.06%)

Udmurts - 497,214 (1.66%)

Mari - 473 015 (1.58%)

Ukrainians - 272 385 (0.91%)

Kazakhs - 221,047 (0.74%)

Armenians - 108,774 (0.36%)

Komi-Perm - 82 979 (0.28%)

Azerbaijanis - 80 727 (0.27%)

Belarusians - 62,560 (0.21%)

Uzbeks - 50 523 (0.17%)

Germans - 48,211 (0.16%)

Tajiks - 33 463 (0.11%)

Roma - 28,270 (0.09%)

Jews - 20 968 (0.07%)

Moldovans - 15,548 (0.05%)

Georgians - 13 534 (0.05%)

Koreans - 12,215 (0.04%)

Chechens - 11,828 (0.04%)

Lezgins - 10 636 (0.04%)

Individuals who did not indicate nationality - 771,435 (2.92%)

Presidential plenipotentiary envoys
Sergey Kiriyenko (18 May 2000 – 14 November 2005)
Aleksandr Konovalov (14 November 2005 – 12 May 2008)
Grigory Rapota (12 May 2008 – 15 December 2011)
Mikhail Babich (15 December 2011 – 24 August 2018)
Igor Panshin (acting) (24 August 2018 – 7 September 2018)
Igor Komarov (7 September 2018 – present)

See also
 List of largest cities in Volga Federal District (in Russian)

References

 
Volga basin
Federal districts of Russia
States and territories established in 2000
2000 establishments in Russia